Hassan Pirnia ( ‎; 1871 – 20 November 1935), was a prominent Iranian politician of 20th-century Iran. He held a total of twenty-four posts during his political career, serving four times as Prime Minister of Iran. He was also a historian, co-founding the Society for the National Heritage of Iran.

Personal life
Hassan was the eldest son of Mirza Nasrullah Khan, a Prime Minister during the Qajar era. Hassan also had a younger brother named Hossein, who served as speaker of the Parliament of Iran.

Career
Hassan became Iran's Minister to the Russian Court before returning to Iran, where he founded the Tehran School of Political Science in 1899.

Upon his father's death, he assumed the title of Moshir al Dowleh, playing an important role in drafting the Persian Constitution of 1906. Hassan was given an Honorary Knight Grand Cross of the Most Distinguished Order of Saint Michael and Saint George by the British crown in 1907. From 1907 to 1908, Pirnia was the Minister of Foreign Affairs, during which time he declared the Anglo-Russian Entente, which would divide Iran into zones of imperial influence, as null and void. 

He later became Minister of Justice before becoming Prime Minister for the first time in 1915. He would re-assume the office in 1920, and again in 1922 and 1923. One of Pirnia's key actions during his time as Prime Minister saw him help prevent the introduction of the Anglo-Persian Agreement of 1919.

During his final period as prime minister, Pirnia appointed Mohammad Mosaddegh as his foreign minister, retaining Reza Khan as his minister of war.

Books and cultural contributions
Following his retirement, he published a three-volume history of pre-Islamic Iran, entitled Tarikh-e Iran-e Bastan (History of Ancient Iran). An abridged version, Tarikh-e Mukhtasar Iran-e Qadim, published in 1928, became a standard textbook for students. Hassan's other significant contributions to the cultural life of Iran included helping to set up the Society for the National Heritage of Iran along with Abdolhossein Teymourtash and Mohammad Ali Foroughi in 1922.

Hassan's younger brother, Hossein Pirnia, was also a notable statesman during this period. Known as Mo'tamen al Molk, he served as Minister of Education in 1918 and Minister without portfolio in 1920. He was elected to every session of the parliament (Majlis) from 1906 and served as its speaker for many years. In 1943 he was elected from Tehran to the 14th session of Parliament but declined to serve.

References

 Ghani, Cyrus, Iran and the Rise of Reza Shah: From Qajar Collapse to Pahlavi Power (I.B. Tauris: London, 2000). 
 Jane Lewisohn, Flowers of Persian Song and Music: Davud Pirniā and the Genesis of the Golhā Programs, Journal of Persianate Studies, Vol. 1, No. 1, pp. 79–101 (2008)
 Marashi, Afshin, Nationalizing Iran: culture, power, and the state, 1870-1940 (University of Washington Press, 2008). 
 Moazami, Behrooz State, Religion, and Revolution in Iran, 1796 to the Present p. 41 (Palgrave Macmillan, 2013) 
 Volodarsky, Mikhail The Soviet Union and Its Southern Neighbours (Taylor & Francis, 2014) 

1871 births
1935 deaths
People from Nain, Iran
Prime Ministers of Iran
20th-century Iranian historians
People of the Persian Constitutional Revolution
Honorary Knights Grand Cross of the Order of St Michael and St George
Moderate Socialists Party politicians
Members of the 2nd Iranian Majlis
Members of the 3rd Iranian Majlis
People of Qajar Iran